The Bahamas Fed Cup team represents the Bahamas in Fed Cup tennis competition and are governed by the Bahamas Lawn Tennis Association.

History
The Bahamas competed in its first Fed Cup in 1990.  Their best result was finishing third in their Group I pool in 2002.

See also
Fed Cup
Bahamas Davis Cup team

External links

Billie Jean King Cup teams
Fed Cup
Fed Cup